Ro-60, originally named Submarine No. 59, was an Imperial Japanese Navy Type L submarine of the L4 subclass. She was in commission from 1923 to 1934 and from 1940 to 1941. Before World War II, she served in the waters of Japan. During World War II, she took part in the Battle of Wake Island before she was wrecked three weeks after the war broke out.

Design and description
The submarines of the Type L4 sub-class were copies of the Group 3 subclass of the British L-class submarine built under license in Japan. They were slightly larger and had two more torpedo tubes than the preceding submarines of the L3 subclass. They displaced  surfaced and  submerged.

For surface running, the submarines were powered by two  Vickers diesel engines, each driving one propeller shaft. When submerged, each propeller was driven by an  electric motor. They could reach  on the surface and  underwater.

The submarines were armed with six internal  torpedo tubes, all in the bow, and carried a total of twelve 6th Year Type torpedoes. They were also armed with a single  deck gun and a 6.5 mm machine gun.

Construction and commissioning

Ro-60 was laid down as Submarine No. 59 on 5 December 1921 by Mitsubishi at Kobe, Japan. Launched on 22 December 1922, she was completed and commissioned on 17 September 1923.

Service history

Pre-World War II
Upon commissioning, Submarine No. 59 was assigned to the Sasebo Naval District. On 9 February 1924, she was reassigned to Submarine Division 26 — in which she spent the remainder of her career — and to the Sasebo Defense Division. On 1 April 1924, Submarine Division 26 was reassigned to Submarine Squadron 1 in the 1st Fleet. Submarine No. 59 was renamed Ro-60 on 1 November 1924.

On 1 December 1925, Submarine Division 26 was reassigned to Submarine Squadron 2 in the 2nd Fleet in the Combined Fleet. The nine submarines got underway from Okinawa on 30 March 1926 for a training cruise in Chinese waters off Shanghai and Amoy which concluded with their arrival at Mako in the Pescadores Islands on 5 April 1926. They departed Mako on 20 April 1926 for the return leg of their training cruise, operating off China near Chusan Island, then returned to Sasebo on 26 April 1926.

On 15 December 1926, the Submarine Division 26 returned to the Sasebo Naval District and the Sasebo Defense Division. On 27 March 1927, Ro-60, Ro-61, Ro-62, Ro-63, Ro-64, and Ro-68 departed Saeki Bay, Japan, for a training cruise off Tsingtao, China, which they concluded with her arrival at Sasebo, Japan, on 16 May 1927. Ro-60 was decommissioned on 10 February 1928 and placed in Third Reserve at Sasebo.

Ro-60 was recommissioned on 20 September 1928 and resumed active service in Submarine Division 26 in the Sasebo Defense Division in the Sasebo Naval District. On 10 December 1928, the division again was assigned to Submarine Squadron 1 in the 1st Fleet. On 1 December 1930, it returned to the Sasebo Naval District, and served in the Sasebo Defense Division again from that date until 15 November 1933. On 1 June 1934, Ro-60 was decommissioned and placed in Second Reserve at Sasebo, and while in Second Reserve was assigned to the Sasebo Guard Squadron from 15 November 1934 to 15 November 1935. She moved to Third Reserve on 15 December 1938 and to Fourth Reserve on 15 November 1939.

Ro-60 again was recommissioned on 15 October 1940, and on 15 November 1940 Submarine Division 26 was reassigned to Submarine Squadron 7 in the 4th Fleet in the Combined Fleet.  When the Imperial Japanese Navy deployed for the upcoming conflict in the Pacific, Ro-60 was at Kwajalein in the Marshall Islands. She received the message "Climb Mount Niitaka 1208" from the Combined Fleet on 2 December 1941, indicating that war with the Allies would commence on 8 December 1941 Japan time, which was on 7 December 1941 on the other side of the International Date Line in Hawaii, where Japanese plans called for the war to open with their attack on Pearl Harbor.

World War II

Battle of Wake Island
Ro-60 was with the other submarines of Submarine Division 26 —  and  — at Kwajalein when Japan entered World War II on 8 December 1941, Kwajalein time. The three submarines were placed on "standby alert" that day as United States Marine Corps forces on Wake Island threw back the first Japanese attempt to invade the atoll. On 12 December 1941, Ro-60 and Ro-61 got underway from Kwajalein to support a second, heavily reinforced Japanese attempt to invade Wake Island; Ro-62 followed on 14 December 1941.

Ro-60 crash-dived, but the attack damaged her periscopes and several of her diving tanks. After she resurfaced that night and her crew inspected her damage, her commanding officer decided that she no longer could dive safely. The Battle of Wake Island ended as Wake Island fell to the Japanese on 23 December 1941, and that day Ro-60 and Ro-62 received orders to return to Kwajalein.

Loss

At about 13:00, the commander of Submarine Squadron 7 arrived on the scene from Kwajalein aboard his flagship, the submarine tender , to supervise rescue and salvage operations personally. Pounded by high surf, Ro-60 incurred additional damage and took on such a heavy list that her crew destroyed her secret documents and abandoned ship. Jingei rescued all 66 members of her crew.

The Japanese struck Ro-60 from the Navy list on 15 February 1942. At some point later in World War II, an unidentified aircraft strafed her wreck, detonating Ro-60′s torpedoes and blowing the wreck apart. Divers who later visited the site found her wreckage strewn all over the reef, with her aft section lying against the reef, her forward section lying  ahead of her stern, her conning tower  from the forward section, and her deck gun  beyond that.

References

Bibliography
, History of Pacific War Extra, "Perfect guide, The submarines of the Imperial Japanese Forces", Gakken (Japan), March 2005, 
The Maru Special, Japanese Naval Vessels No.43 Japanese Submarines III, Ushio Shobō (Japan), September 1980, Book code 68343-44
The Maru Special, Japanese Naval Vessels No.132 Japanese Submarines I "Revised edition", Ushio Shobō (Japan), February 1988, Book code 68344-36
The Maru Special, Japanese Naval Vessels No.133 Japanese Submarines II "Revised edition", Ushio Shobō (Japan), March 1988, Book code 68344-37

External links
Photo of the wreck of Ro-60 in 2004 at combinedfleet.com

Ro-60-class submarines
Japanese L type submarines
1922 ships
Ships built by Mitsubishi Heavy Industries
World War II submarines of Japan
Maritime incidents in December 1941
Japanese submarine accidents
Japanese submarines lost during World War II
World War II shipwrecks in the Pacific Ocean